The Iranian University Entrance Exam, simply known as Konkour (Persian: کنکور; from the French Concours), is a standardized test used as one of the means to gain admission to higher education in Iran. Generally, to get a Ph.D. in non-medical majors, there are three exams, all of them called Konkour.

Nationwide
In June/July each year, high school graduates in Iran take a stringent, centralized nationwide university entrance exam seeking a place in one of the public universities. The competition is fierce and the exam content rigorous, since university places are limited. In recent years, although the government has responded to demands for improved access and to a rapid increase in the rising number of applicants by increasing the capacity of universities and creating the Islamic Azad University, public universities are still only able to accept 10 percent of all applicants.

History and trends
In Iran, as in many other countries where a university entrance exam is a sole criterion for student selection, the Konkour exam is a comprehensive, 4.5-hour multiple-choice exam that covers all subjects taught in Iranian high schools, from math and science to Islamic studies and foreign languages. The exam is so stringent that students normally spend years preparing for it. Those who fail are allowed to repeat the test in subsequent years until they pass it.

The Ministry of Science, Research, and Technology has established the Education Evaluation Organization to oversee all aspects of the test. As the sole criterion for student admissions into universities in Iran, Konkour has gone through many phases. In pre-revolutionary Iran, the exam was — as it is currently — a comprehensive knowledge test and an assessment of academic achievement for admissions. However, the problem in that era was that the selection methods provided advantages to candidates from urban areas, especially those from the upper and upper-middle classes with better education and preparation. Thus, almost 70 to 80 percent of university entrants came from large cities.

In the early years of postrevolutionary Iran, the purpose of testing shifted from being a mere knowledge test to an instrument to ensure the "Islamization of universities," aimed at admitting students who were committed to the ideology of the 1979 revolution. The university entrance exam judged admissions candidates not only by their academic test score but also by their social and political background and loyalty to the Islamic government.

In the early 1980s, a quota system was introduced to further democratize the selection criteria by allowing underprivileged students preferential treatment. A year after the Iran-Iraq war ended, a law was passed to help handicapped and volunteer veterans enter universities, reserving 40 percent of university seats for war veterans.

An additional criterion for student selection was introduced in the early 1990s to localize the student population, giving priority to candidates who applied to study in their native provinces. This policy was to prevent student migration into the larger cities. The requirement of service after graduation was also instrumental in providing education and health to needy areas.

Reform options

In Iran, admission to university — especially to prestigious public and highly selective universities such as Sharif University of Technology (SUT), Isfahan University of Technology (IUT), Shiraz University of Medical Sciences (SUMS), Iran University of Science and Technology (IUST), Shahid Beheshti University (SBU), Amirkabir University of Technology (AUT), K.N.Toosi University of Technology (KNTU), University of Tehran (UT), University of Tabriz (UT), Shiraz University (SU) and the University of Isfahan (UI) remains a means of achieving elevated status in a society in which education is a major determinant of class mobility.

Graduates of such universities have a better chance of securing increasingly limited jobs in prestigious professions in Iran — such as medicine, engineering, and law — making success in the entrance exam the first and perhaps the most important hoop through which Iranian students must jump. 

As the Konkour crisis persists, authorities are contemplating a replacement mechanism for student selection. One of the options being considered is to use the cumulative grade-point average (GPA) of the final three years of high school to admit students. While this policy seems more humanistic and fair than using a single exam to measure students' ability, it still cannot ensure fairness or reveal students' aptitude for further learning. Incorporating interviews, essay writing, and aptitude tests in addition to GPA would perhaps be a more effective way of measuring students' qualifications when they are applying to attend university.

Another long-term approach to remedy the crisis in Iran would be to rely on mid-career education and training (in lieu of the current pre-career pattern of university education) by introducing the concept of community college into Iran's education system. This approach could serve to deter less academically inclined students from participating in the university entrance exams and hopefully eventually alleviate the crisis.

See also
SAT, the US equivalent
List of admissions tests
List of universities in Iran
Higher education in Iran

References 

Education in Iran
Standardised tests in Iran
Higher education in Iran